The Plymouth & Lincoln Railroad is a class III shortline railroad operating on the Concord-Lincoln rail line in central New Hampshire, United States. The railroad consists of two distinct passenger operations, the Hobo Railroad, which offers passenger excursion trains in the White Mountains, and the Winnipesaukee Scenic Railroad, which operates passenger excursion trains along the shore of Lake Winnipesaukee in the Lakes Region of New Hampshire. In addition to passenger operations, the railroad owns the Lincoln Shops, a railroad equipment maintenance and repair facility located in Lincoln, New Hampshire.

History
On June 15, 1987, the Plymouth and Lincoln Railroad was formed with the purpose of operating a theme park and railroad out of Lincoln, New Hampshire. Edward Clark and his wife Brenda Reynolds Clark were the owners.
  

After a few years of operating the railroad in Lincoln under the "Hobo Railroad" name, the railroad was invited to bid on the lease for the state-owned trackage from Tilton to Plymouth. They won the bid, and the Winnipesaukee Scenic Railroad was formed, with trains running from Meredith to Lakeport, with a stop in Weirs Beach. 

This additional mileage allows the operation of many special excursion trains. The state owns another  of track from Lochmere to Concord, which is used by the New England Southern Railroad for freight customers.

Edward Clark, founder of the railroad, died in the summer of 1998. Benjamin, his only son, assumed the post of President and promoted the business heavily.

The Lincoln Shops
From the mid-1990s, the Lincoln Shops have grown to be a major source of off-season revenue through its refurbishing and repair of numerous pieces of customer railroad equipment. Two Russell snowplows and some subway tampers were rebuilt for the MBTA. The privately owned ex-New Haven Railroad Roger Williams was in for major restoration to like-new condition, along with four or five caboose repaintings. The company's reputation increased the demand for the facility enough to make the business a 12-month operation. 2005 brought the three-car set of the Flying Yankee, under restoration, to the Lincoln Shops for completion. In 2021, 2 major locomotive repaints to PLLX 105 & 1590 were done as well as interior on 105.

Current activities
The railroad has some of the most diverse and scenic fall foliage trains in New England, whether lakeside or on a journey along the Pemigewasset River to the mountains. Since 2003 the railroad has promoted heavily this important season for tourism. It also benefits from its -hour travel time from Boston. Bus groups, sometimes eight per day, converge in Meredith in the fall due to the town's location and to the offering of a full roast turkey dinner on the train catered by Hart's Turkey Farm Restaurant, also located in Meredith.

In winter 2005, the "Believe in Books Literacy Foundation" contracted with the railroad to provide a "Polar Express" out of Lincoln, to supplement the growing demand from the North Conway operation run by the Conway Scenic Railroad. The Tom Hanks movie of the same name was released in the 2004-2005 season, sparking even further interest.

In June 2021, Rail Bike Adventures began offering 2-hour tours out of Laconia Station along the shores of Lake Winnisquam. 

Three ALCO S1 switchers (all of them are currently out of service; one switcher is from the Portland Terminal Company and two are from the Maine Central Railroad), an ALCO S3 switcher from the Boston and Maine Railroad, 2 EMD SW1000's, 1 EMD SW1001, and a former Rock Island Railroad EMD GP7 provide the motive power for the two railroads. Four former Erie Lackawanna Railroad cars and six former Budd RDCs from the MBTA in Boston comprise the railroad cars that they use for operations.

Service stations 
The Plymouth & Lincoln Railroad provides passenger service to the following stations:

Locomotive roster

Rolling stock

Rail Bike Adventures

See also
List of heritage railroads in the United States

References

External links
Hobo Scenic Railroad/Winnipesaukee Scenic Railroad official website
 Flying Yankee Restoration Group
Clark's Trading Post
FoliageTrains.com
HawkinsRails' Hobo and Winnipesaukee Scenic page
Lochmere Limited Trip

Heritage railroads in New Hampshire
Tourist attractions in Belknap County, New Hampshire
Tourist attractions in Grafton County, New Hampshire
Transportation in Belknap County, New Hampshire
Transportation in Grafton County, New Hampshire
Meredith, New Hampshire
Lincoln, New Hampshire